The women's keirin at the 2022 Commonwealth Games was part of the cycling programme, which took place on 1 August 2022.

Schedule
The schedule is as follows:

All times are British Summer Time (UTC+1)

Results

First round
The top two in each heat advanced directly to the second round; the remainder were sent to the first round repechages.

Heat 1

Heat 2

Heat 3

Heat 4

First round repechages
Only the repechage winners advanced to the second round.

Heat 1

Heat 2

Heat 3

Heat 4

Second round
The top three in each heat advanced to the final; the remainder were sent to the small final (for places 7–12).

Heat 1

Heat 2

Finals
The final classification was determined in the medal finals.
Final (places 7–12)

Final (places 1–6)

References

Women's keirin
Cycling at the Commonwealth Games – Women's keirin
Comm